Olli-Pekka Peltola (born 8 September 1969) is a Finnish biathlete. He competed at the 1998 Winter Olympics and the 2002 Winter Olympics.

References

External links
 

1969 births
Living people
Finnish male biathletes
Olympic biathletes of Finland
Biathletes at the 1998 Winter Olympics
Biathletes at the 2002 Winter Olympics
People from Kyyjärvi
Sportspeople from Central Finland